Jacob "Jaap" Eisse Bulder (27 September 1896 in Groningen – 30 April 1979 in Leiderdorp) was a football (soccer) player from the Netherlands, who represented his home country at the 1920 Summer Olympics in Antwerp, Belgium. There he won the bronze medal with the Netherlands national football team.

Club career
Bulder played for hometown club Be Quick, making his debut on 23 October 1910 against WVV. He won the Dutch league title with Be Quick in 1920. He played his final game on 9 April 1928 against Frisia. Until the appearance of Abe Lenstra, Bulder was considered the best footballer to appear on the northern fields. He was a dribbler, a king scorer, a technician who practiced with the tennis ball with brother Evert Bulder in their early years. At the age of fourteen, Jaap Bulder already made it through to the first of the great Be Quick . He won eleven northern division titles with Be Quick, in 1920 they even took the national championship. It was a season to remember: Bulder scored 59 goals in 14 matches. The center forward set a record of 8 goals in a 14-0 win against Veendam, in 1920 and 8 in a 10-0 win against Alcides, in 1922, that record would last until 1956, where Henk Schouten scored 9.

In the same championship year, Jaap Bulder criticized the Dutch national team for never recruiting players from the north. It cost him his debut in Orange. The NVB excluded the attacker, but he was still part of the Antwerp Games. Rebellion against the officials about the bad shelter in Antwerp and going out again cost Bulder his place. He only returned to the national team after twenty months. He played in the indoor trio with his club mates Appie Groen and Harry Rodermond. The eyes for northern talents were finally opened.

On 16 September 1923 Jaap scored 2 goals in 1 minute against Velocitas, in the final of the Groninger Dagbladbeker.

Career statistics

International career
He made his debut for the Netherlands in an August 1920 friendly match against Luxembourg in which he immediately scored and earned a total of 6 caps, scoring 6 goals. His final match was in an April 1923 friendly match against France.

Personal life
Bulder was born in Groningen.  His older brother Evert (born  1893) was also a footballer and a member of the same Olympic squad. Bulder died, aged 82, in Leiderdorp.

Honours

References

External links

Statistics from RSSSF

1896 births
1979 deaths
Footballers from Groningen (city)
Association football forwards
Dutch footballers
Netherlands international footballers
Footballers at the 1920 Summer Olympics
Olympic footballers of the Netherlands
Olympic bronze medalists for the Netherlands
Olympic medalists in football
Medalists at the 1920 Summer Olympics
Be Quick 1887 players